Pinalia polyura, or many-tailed pinalia, is a member of the orchid family endemic to the Philippines. It is semi-pendulous and sympodial, with pseudobulbs that are 20 cm long, 1 cm in diameter, and somewhat club shaped. Each new growth begins halfway along the previous year's pseudobulbs, making the plant longer each year. Each pseudobulb has about 5 shiny, lanceolate leaves approximately 15 cm long and 2 cm wide. It grows as an epiphyte and sometimes as a semi-terrestrial plant at elevations to 2,400 meters.

Taxonomic history

John Lindley named this species Eria polyura in 1841 in Edwards's Botanical Register. It was moved to the genus Pinalia in 1892 by Otto Kuntze.

References

polyura
Orchids of the Philippines
Plants described in 1841